Luxury is the second full-length studio album by the indie rock band The Nein.  It was released on February 20, 2007 on Sonic Unyon.

Track listing
All songs written and composed by The Nein.

 "Burn Construction"
 "Attitude and Mirrors"
 "Sweet Vague"
 "Journalist, Pt. 1"
 "Journalist, Pt. 2"
 "Achilles Last Tape Solo"
 "Ennio"
 "Decollage"
 "Radical Chic"
 "Wreck-We-Um-Dub"
 "Get Up"
 "The Future Crumbles"
 "A Landscape"

Personnel

The Nein
 Finn Cohen – Vocals, guitar
 Robert Biggers – drum, keyboards
 Dale Flattum – Loops, sampling, tapes

Guest musicians
 Eric Roehrig – Background music, commentary
 Chris Rossi – Vibraphone

Production
 Matt Kalb – Engineering
 Chris Logan – A&R
 Ryan Granville Martin – Effects, mixing
 Finn Cohen – Programming
 Ramen Royale – Artwork
 Ben Spiker – Photography

References

External links

Luxury at Rate Your Music

2007 albums
Sonic Unyon Records albums